In law, post conviction refers to the legal process which takes place after a trial results in conviction of the defendant. After conviction, a court will proceed with sentencing the guilty party. In the American criminal justice system, once a defendant has received a guilty verdict, he or she can then challenge a conviction or sentence. This takes place through different legal actions, known as filing an appeal or a federal habeas corpus proceeding. The goal of these proceedings is exoneration, or proving a convicted person innocent. If lacking representation, the defendant may consult or hire an attorney to exercise his or her legal rights.

The post-conviction process is in place to protect innocent individuals from inherent human error in the criminal justice system. One study cites 10,000 innocent people are convicted each year in the United States.

Criminal appeals 

The appeals process is the request for a formal change of a decision made by a court of law. The litigant who files the appeal is known as the "appellant". A successful appeal must demonstrate to a higher court that the trial court made a decision affected by legal error. The appellate procedure in the United States takes place in appellate court, and that court normally makes its judgment based only on the record of the original case. The appellant generally submits a document of legal arguments called a "brief", a written attempt to persuade the judges of appellate court that the decision of the trial court should be reversed.  If selected for an "oral argument", appellants may present a short spoken argument to the court. No additional pieces of evidence or witnesses are considered.

The ruling made by the appellate court is usually final. 
The decision of the appellate court generally affirms the original decision of the trial court. However, 10–20% of civil and criminal appeals are successful in reversing the decision of the original trial. If the appeals process is unsuccessful, a convicted person may pursue other options, depending upon the severity of his or her sentence and the  crime committed.

Writs

Writs are directives from a higher court to a lower court or government official, and are only issued when the one seeking the writ (the moving party) has no other options. Most states in the United States allow convicted parties to file several specific writs (legal actions). These writs require that the detainee be considered by a judge or court, and are in place to prevent unconstitutional imprisonment.

Habeas Corpus 

Also known as the "great writ' Habeas Corpus writs are most common. Many countries, including the United States, Australia, New Zealand, Malaysia and Canada have adopted the practice from English common law. Habeas corpus is a judicial mandate to a prison official which orders that an inmate be brought to trial to determine whether the imprisonment is lawful and if it should continue. Typically, an inmate will argue that his imprisonment is unconstitutional. While habeas corpus can be filed in state or federal court, all state avenues must be exhausted first.

In the United States federal court system the writ of habeas corpus is used most frequently to review state court convictions. Federal statutes (28 U.S.C. §§ 2241–2256) outline the procedural aspects of federal habeas corpus proceedings. Additionally, the Supreme Court of the United States may use the certiorari writ to review United States Courts of Appeals cases or cases from state courts. Error coram nobis is another writ issued only rarely at the federal level in cases of federal criminal convictions when "no other remedy is available". This process is similar to the state writ process, though inmates must consume all state appeals and writ options before moving forward. This is an important part of the legal strategy, especially for those inmates who have legitimate claims.

Capital cases 
Cases that involve the death penalty are especially significant in the post conviction stage. These inmates will often file numerous appeals to courts at every level. In these unique cases, inmates can file an appeal which could potentially be reviewed by the United States Supreme Court. The court has the ability to stay the execution if some legal flaw in the original trial comes to light. The Court does not often exercise this power, though several individuals from around the world sentenced with capital punishment have been exonerated in the past thirty years.

Inmates in this position can also file for clemency or pardon. Practices vary from state to state, but the clemency process usually requires the governor or board of advisors or both. Since 1976 273 death row inmates have been granted clemency for humanitarian reasons. These include doubts about the petitioner's guilt or a governor's personal stance on capital punishment.

Innocence work 
Overturning a conviction after dozens of appeals and petitions have been denied is notoriously difficult, though prisoners have some options at their disposal. They can still attain freedom if legitimate innocence can be proven. The most common method is by using DNA evidence to disprove a crime that happened before DNA testing was a viable option. The Innocence Project, founded to exonerate those convicted wrongfully, has found more than 300 post-conviction DNA exonerations in the history of the United States. Attorneys can file a motion to introduce strong new evidence to the courts. Other common innocence efforts center on victim recantations if applicable.

References

External links
Post Conviction Relief Law & Legal Definition
What is Post-Conviction Relief? from the Oregon Department of Justice
Post Conviction Rememedies by the American Bar Association

The Post Conviction Justice Project

Further reading
Wallin, PJ; Klarich, SD (2013). Criminal Appeals Process: How to Appeal a Criminal Conviction California: Wallin & Klarich, ALC.

Criminal justice
Practice of law